Court Lake is in Benson County, North Dakota, in the United States.

Court Lake bears the name of Ignatius Court, a Native American translator.

References

Lakes of North Dakota
Bodies of water of Benson County, North Dakota